Ron Irvine (10 March 1927 – 28 April 1984) was  a former Australian rules footballer who played with Richmond in the Victorian Football League (VFL).

Notes

External links 		
		
		
		
		
		
		
		
1927 births		
1984 deaths		
Australian rules footballers from Victoria (Australia)		
Richmond Football Club players
Box Hill Football Club players